The 2009 Samsung Securities Cup was a professional tennis tournament played on outdoor hard courts. It was the tenth edition of the tournament which was part of the Tretorn SERIE+ of the 2009 ATP Challenger Tour. It took place in Seoul, South Korea between 26 October and 1 November 2009.

ATP entrants

Seeds

 Rankings are as of October 19, 2009.

Other entrants
The following players received wildcards into the singles main draw:
  Cho Soong-yae
  Kim Sun-yong
  Lim Yong-kyu
  Noh Sang-woo

The following players received entry from the qualifying draw:
  Matthias Bachinger
  Greg Jones (as a Lucky loser)
  Frederik Nielsen
  Igor Sijsling
  Takao Suzuki

Champions

Singles

 Lukáš Lacko def.  Dušan Lojda, 6–4, 6–2

Doubles

 Rik de Voest /  Lu Yen-hsun def.  Sanchai Ratiwatana /  Sonchat Ratiwatana, 7–6(5), 3–6, [10–6]

External links
South Korean Tennis Federation official website
ITF Search 
2009 Draws

Samsung Securities Cup
Samsung Securities Cup
Samsung